Cololobus is a genus of flowering plants belonging to the family Asteraceae.

Its native range is Southeastern Brazil.

Species:

Cololobus argenteus 
Cololobus hatschbachii 
Cololobus longiangustatus 
Cololobus rupestris

References

Asteraceae
Asteraceae genera